Bennie Allen Purcell  (December 10, 1929 – February 12, 2016) was a basketball player who became a tennis coach at Murray State University, coaching the Racers for 28 years. His teams won 11 Ohio Valley Conference men's tennis championships, and he was eight times selected OVC Men's Tennis Coach of the Year.

Collegiate basketball career
Previously, he played basketball at Murray State and was the first player in school history to score more than 1,000 points for his career, finishing with 1,054 points from 1948 to 1952. He was twice selected All-OVC and earned all-America honors after his play at the small college NAIB tournament in Kansas City in 1952.

After college
After his college career, he toured with the Harlem Globetrotters before returning to Murray to serve as assistant basketball coach under Cal Luther before later taking over as head tennis coach in 1968.

Purcell is a member of Murray State's athletics hall of fame and his No. 21 is one of nine retired by Murray State for basketball. He was inducted into the Ohio Valley Conference Hall of Fame in 1990, the Kentucky Tennis Hall of Fame in 1994 and the Intercollegiate Tennis Association's Hall of Fame in 1999. Murray State's tennis courts are named in his honor.

Family
His son, former professional tennis player Mel Purcell, succeeded him as head tennis coach at Murray State in 1996.

References

External links
GoRacers.com
OVCSports.com

1929 births
2016 deaths
American men's basketball players
American tennis coaches
Baltimore Bullets (1944–1954) draft picks
Basketball players from Illinois
Guards (basketball)
Murray State Racers men's basketball players
People from Mount Vernon, Illinois
People from Murray, Kentucky
Tennis people from Kentucky